Azad Rahman Shakil (popularly known as Master Shakil) is a Bangladeshi film actor. He won Bangladesh National Film Award for Best Child Artist twice for the film Dumurer Phul (1978) and Danpithe Chele (1980).

Selected films
 Dumurer Phul - 1978
 Din Jai Kotha Thakey - 1979 
 Danpithe Chele - (1980)
 Lagam - 1981
 Kalmilata - 1981
 Devdas - 1982
 Puroshkar - 1983
 Ekhono Onek Raat'' - 1997

Awards and nominations
National Film Awards

References

External links

Bangladeshi film actors
Best Child Artist National Film Award (Bangladesh) winners
Living people
Year of birth missing (living people)